Bayin Htwe (1470s–1533) was king of Prome (Pyay) from 1527 to 1532. His small kingdom, founded by his father Thado Minsaw in 1482, was conquered by the Confederation of Shan States in 1532, and he was taken prisoner to Upper Burma. He was later released, and returned to Prome only to be refused entry by his son Narapati. Bayin Htwe died at the outskirts of Prome (Pyay) in mid 1533.

Brief

Bayin Htwe was a son of Thado Minsaw who proclaimed independence of his minor kingdom from Ava in 1482. Htwe ascended the throne in 1526 after his father's death. His formal title was Thiri Thudhamma Yaza (သီရိသုဓမ္မရာဇာ). The new king soon incurred the wrath of Saw Lon, the leader of Confederation of Shan States because he did not send help in the Confederation's war against Ava in 1526–1527. His father had been an ally of Lon, and sent troops in their 1524–1525 assault on Ava. In 1532, Lon and his Confederation armies (12,000 troops, 800 horses and 30 elephants) laid siege to Prome. Htwe surrendered in late 1532, and was sent to Dabayin in Upper Burma in exile. Htwe's son Narapati was appointed vassal king.

Htwe's life in captivity was cut short after Lon was assassinated by his own ministers near Myedu, enabling his return to Prome. He arrived back at the outskirts of Prome, five months after he lost his throne. But Narapati did not allow him back in the city. He died about a month later in the adjoining forests.

Family
His legacy lived on through his offspring. Two of his sons, Narapati and Minkhaung, became rulers of Prome, albeit as vassals of Ava. Two of his daughters, Salin Mibaya and Laygyun Mibaya, respectively were married to Viceroy Thado Dhamma Yaza II of Prome and Viceroy Minkhaung II of Toungoo. Another daughter, Minkhaung Medaw was married to King Taka Yut Pi of Hanthawaddy, and later to King Min Bin of Arakan. He was the maternal grandfather of Queen Hsinbyushin Medaw of Lan Na and Queen Min Taya Medaw, a principal queen of King Nanda of Toungoo Dynasty.

Ancestry
The following is his ancestry as reported in the Hmannan Yazawin chronicle, which in turn referenced contemporary inscriptions. His parents were first cousins.

Notes

References

Bibliography
 
 
 
 
 

Prome dynasty
1533 deaths
Year of birth unknown
16th-century Burmese monarchs